Nasimi is a Baku Metro station. It was opened on 9 October 2008. It is named after Imadaddin Nasimi.

See also
List of Baku metro stations

References

Baku Metro stations
Railway stations opened in 2008
2008 establishments in Azerbaijan